CBSé - Establecimiento Santa Ana is an organic beverage company specializing in yerba mate products, based in Argentina. The company exports their products internationally since 2000. CBSé mostly offers loose-leaf yerba mate with a various flavors. Their most popular products are CBSé Hierbas Serranas, CBSé Limon, CBSé Cafe, CBSé Silueta, CBSé Energia.

References

External links
 

Yerba mate
Argentine brands
1978 establishments in Argentina
Food and drink companies based in Buenos Aires
c
Organic farming organizations
Organizations established in 1978